WJAW is a sports formatted broadcast radio station licensed to St. Marys, West Virginia, United States, serving the Mid-Ohio Valley.  WJAW is owned and operated by JAWCO, Inc.

External links
ESPN Radio 100.9 and 630 Online

JAW
ESPN Radio stations
Radio stations established in 1984
1984 establishments in West Virginia